The Anti-Party Group was a Stalinist group within the leadership of the Communist Party of the Soviet Union that unsuccessfully attempted to depose Nikita Khrushchev as First Secretary of the Party in June 1957. The group, given that epithet by Khrushchev, was led by former Premiers Georgy Malenkov and Vyacheslav Molotov and former First Deputy Chairman Lazar Kaganovich. The group rejected both Khrushchev's excess liberalization of Soviet society and his denunciation of Joseph Stalin, and promoted the full restoration and preservation of Stalinism.

Motives

The members of the group regarded Khrushchev's attacks on Stalin, most famously in the Secret Speech delivered at the 20th Congress of the CPSU in 1956 as wrong and hypocritical, given Khrushchev's complicity in the Great Purge and similar events as one of Stalin's favorites. They believed that Khrushchev's policy of peaceful coexistence would jeopardize struggle against capitalist powers internationally.

Attempted take-over

On June 18, 1957, the leaders of the group – Malenkov, Molotov and Kaganovich – were joined at the last minute by Foreign Minister Dmitri Shepilov, whom Kaganovich had convinced that the group had a majority. Although they did not have a majority in the entire Presidium of the CPSU Central Committee, they had a majority of the Politburo's 11 full members.  who were the only ones that could vote. In the Presidium the group's proposal to replace Khrushchev as First Secretary with Premier Nikolai Bulganin won with 7 to 4 votes in which Malenkov, Molotov, Kaganovich, Bulganin, Voroshilov, Pervukhin and Saburov supported and Khrushchev, Mikoyan, Suslov and Kirichenko opposed, but Khrushchev argued that only the plenum of the Central Committee could remove him from office. At an extraordinary session of the Central Committee held on June 22, Khrushchev argued that his opponents were an "anti-party group". 

Khrushchev had the approval of the military, headed by Minister of Defense Georgy Zhukov. At that plenary session of Central Committee Zhukov supported Khrushchev, and used the military to bring in supporters of Khrushchev to convince people to support him. He made a bitter speech, accusing the group of having blood on their hands over Stalin's atrocities. He even went further saying that he had the military power to crush them, stating: "The Army is against this resolution and not even a tank will leave its position without my order!". In the end of the power struggle, Khruschev was reaffirmed in his position as First Secretary.

Aftermath

Malenkov, Molotov, Kaganovich and Shepilov – the only four names made public – were vilified in the press and deposed from their positions in party and government. They were given relatively unimportant positions:
Molotov was sent as ambassador to Mongolia
Malenkov became director of a hydroelectric plant in Kazakhstan
Kaganovich became director of a small potash works in the Urals
Shepilov became head of the Economics Institute of the local Academy of Sciences of Kyrgyzstan

In 1958, Premier Bulganin, the intended beneficiary of the anti-party group's move, was forced to retire and Khrushchev became Premier as well.

In 1961, in the wake of further de-Stalinisation, Molotov, Malenkov, Kaganovich, and Shepilov were expelled from the Communist Party altogether and all lived mostly quiet lives from then on. Shepilov was allowed to rejoin the party by Khrushchev's successor Leonid Brezhnev in 1976 but remained on the sidelines.  

Khrushchev also deposed Defense Minister Zhukov in 1961.  Zhukov had assisted Khrushchev against the anti-party group, but the two developed significant political differences in the following years.  Khrushchev alleged Bonapartism as a justification for Zhukov's removal. 

Khrushchev's treatment of his opponents, in that they were vilified and humiliated but not physically oppressed, marked a departure from earlier practice in Soviet politics (as last seen in 1953 during the purge of Lavrenti Beria) – a development that was followed during later power struggles, such as Khrushchev's own deposition by Brezhnev in 1964 and the failed coup against Mikhail Gorbachev in August 1991.

As a result of the incident, Khrushchev's position within the international communist bloc became insecure for a time, thus necessitating the support of Chinese Communist Party and Mao Zedong. The CCP thus traded its support for Khrushchev for Soviet technology of nuclear weapons. The Agreement on New Technology for National Defence was later signed in October.

See also
The Gang of Four in China
The Natolin faction in Poland
1965 Bulgarian coup d'état attempt

References

External links
 
 

Factions in the Communist Party of the Soviet Union
Soviet phraseology
Anti-revisionist organizations
Attempted coups in the Soviet Union
1957 in the Soviet Union
1950s coups d'état and coup attempts